Peter Olaf Gooderham CMG (born 29 July 1954) is a British diplomat,  serving as International Director at the Ministry of Justice.

He completed a BA in Politics and Economics at Newcastle University in  1975. After a brief period of working as a management trainee, Gooderham spent the period 1976–78 completing a PhD in Modern History at Bristol University.

From 2004 to 2007 he was the Foreign and Commonwealth Office's Director of the Middle East and North Africa Directorate, based in London. In that role he provided information to the House of Commons Select Committee on International Development on the work of the Quartet on the Middle East and Hamas.

Gooderham was the United Kingdom's Permanent Representative to the United Nations and other international organisations at Geneva 2008–12. He attracted news attention for walking out, with delegates from at least 30 countries, in protest at Iranian President Mahmoud Ahmadinejad's speech during the 2009 Durban Review Conference.

References
GOODERHAM, Peter Olaf, Who's Who 2013, A & C Black, 2013; online edn, Oxford University Press, Dec 2012, accessed 9 April 2013

Place of birth missing (living people)
1954 births
Living people
Alumni of Newcastle University
Alumni of the University of Bristol
British diplomats
Companions of the Order of St Michael and St George